Joana Maria Fomm (born September 14, 1939) is a Brazilian actress.

Biography 
Joana Fomm was born in Belo Horizonte, but her mother died when she was still a baby and she was adopted by her uncles in Rio de Janeiro.

Career 
Joana began her acting career at the Teatro Municipal in Rio de Janeiro in 1961, while still a student at Escola de Arte Dramática Martins Pena. She debuted in film in 1962 in O Quinto Poder by Alberto Pieralisi. In 1964, she made her first television appearance on TV Rio in the telenovela O Desconhecido, written by Nelson Rodrigues.

She won the APCA Award for Best Actress in Television in 1978, and the Candango for Best Actress in 1990.

Selected television
Magnifica 70 (2015–16)

References

External links 

Brazilian telenovela actresses
People from Belo Horizonte
Brazilian television actresses
Brazilian film actresses
Brazilian stage actresses
Living people
1940 births